Riley Elizabeth Clemmons is an American Christian musician, who plays Christian pop style contemporary worship music. She is known for her Christian radio hits, "Broken Prayers" and "Better for It". She released her debut self-titled album via American music distributor Capitol CMG on August 3, 2018.

Early and personal life
Riley Clemmons was "discovered" at a school pageant in Nashville by manager, Mitchell Solarek. She would begin writing songs at the age of 13 and played shows around her hometown. She has worked on her musical craft for several years, including eight years of vocal lessons and a decade of dance lessons. She is currently signed to Capitol CMG.

Music career
In 2015, Clemmons signed to the independent label, Maxx Recordings. Her lyrics are inspired by the struggles of her relationships and faith. She wants to use the power of music and words to wake up and encourage the generation she is a part of.

2017–present: Breakthrough and self-titled debut studio album
Clemmons released her debut single on Capitol CMG, "Broken Prayers", on December 8, 2017. A music video was released on the same day. She discussed her story behind the song in a video uploaded to her YouTube channel, "The song "Broken Prayers" came truly from a place of brokenness and that feeling of having to get yourself together and bring the best most picture-perfect version of yourself to God, basically feeling like the broken pieces aren't good enough for God. The song came from a place of truly finding peace in the fact that God takes you at your most broken, at your lowest place and at your roughest. And not only does He take you there but He delights in it. And He genuinely loves you in that place." The song was released to Christian radio and peaked at No. 17 on the Hot Christian Songs chart.

She released her second single, "Better For It," on June 8, 2018. A music video was also released. Clemmons announced she will join Danny Gokey and Tauren Wells for "The Hope Encounter" Tour in September until November. The song peaked at No. 37 on the Hot Christian Songs chart. A music video for "Hold On" was released on July 19, 2018.

Clemmons' self-titled debut studio album was released on August 4, 2018. The album debuted at No. 28 on the Top Christian Albums chart and No. 13 on the US Heatseekers Albums chart.

Discography

Studio albums

Extended plays

Singles

As featured artist

Awards

GMA Dove Awards 

|-
| 2019
| Riley Clemmons
| New Artist of the Year
| 
|-
| 2022
| "Without You" 
| Rap/Hip Hop Recorded Song of the Year
| 
|-
|}

References

External links
 

Living people
American performers of Christian music
Musicians from Nashville, Tennessee
Songwriters from Tennessee
1999 births